Voyager may refer to:

Computing and communications
 LG Voyager, a mobile phone model manufactured by LG Electronics
 NCR Voyager, a computer platform produced by NCR Corporation
 Voyager (computer worm), a computer worm affecting Oracle databases
 Voyager (library program), the integrated library system from Ex Libris Group
 Voyager (web browser), a web browser for Amiga computers
 HP Voyager series, code name for a Hewlett-Packard series of handheld programmable calculators

Transport

Air
 Airbus Voyager, Royal Air Force version of the Airbus A330 MRTT
 Frequent flyer program of South African Airways
 Egvoyager Voyager 203, an Italian ultralight aircraft
 Raj Hamsa Voyager, an Indian ultralight trike design
 Rutan Voyager, the first airplane to fly around the world nonstop without refuelling

Land
 Bombardier Voyager, a high-speed train operated in the United Kingdom
 Bombardier Voyager (British Rail Class 220), a non-tilting train built 2000–2001
 Bombardier Super Voyager (British Rail Class 221), a tilting train built 2001–2002
 Chrysler Voyager, a minivan
 Kawasaki Voyager, two series of motorcycles
 Mercury Voyager, a station wagon
 Plymouth Voyager, two series of vans

Water
 , a Royal Australian Navy destroyer
 , a Royal Navy destroyer
 , a high-speed ferry
 , a US Navy motorboat
 , a Royal Caribbean cruise ship

Space
 Voyager program, a NASA program of unmanned space probes
 Voyager 1, an unmanned spacecraft launched September 5, 1977
 Voyager 2, an unmanned spacecraft launched August 20, 1977
 Voyager program (Mars), a cancelled series of space probes which would have traveled to the planet Mars
 VSS Voyager, the proposed second vessel of the Virgin Galactic suborbital tourism fleet
 Voyager (communications satellite), a series of American OSCAR satellites
 The Voyager, the first simulator constructed at the Christa McAuliffe Space Education Center

Arts and entertainment

Film
 Voyager, a 1991 German film
 V'Ger, or Voyager 6, a fictional NASA space probe in Star Trek: The Motion Picture (1979)
 Voyagers (film), a 2021 American science fiction film

Music
 Voyager (English band), a British pop-rock group
 Voyager (Australian band), an Australian progressive metal band
 Voyager (Manilla Road album)
 Voyager (Mike Oldfield album)
 Voyager (Paul Epworth album)
 Voyager (Space Needle album)
 Voyager (Walter Meego album)
 Voyager (311 album)
 "Voyager" (song), by Pendulum
 "Voyager", a song from the Alan Parsons Project album Pyramid
 "Voyager", a song from the Daft Punk album  Discovery
 Voyager, an album by Funk Trek
 Voyager, an album by The Jet Age of Tomorrow
 The Voyager 2014 album by Jenny Lewis
 Minimoog Voyager, an electronic musical instrument
 Voyager, a Japanese band.

Television
 Voyagers!, an NBC television series, broadcast from 1982 to 1983
 Earth Star Voyager, a 1988 television pilot that aired on Wonderful World of Disney
 Star Trek: Voyager, a UPN science fiction television series, produced from 1995 to 2001
 USS Voyager (Star Trek), the titular starship of the series
 Voyager (submarine), the miniaturized flying submarine in the 1968–1970 animated TV series Fantastic Voyage
 "Voyager's Return", an episode of the ITV science fiction television series Space: 1999 featuring a fictional space probe "Voyager One"

Books
 Voyager (novel), a 1992 time travel romance novel by Diana Gabaldon
 Voyager: A Life of Hart Crane, a 1969 biography of Hart Crane by John Unterecker
 Voyager: Seeking Newer Worlds in the Third Great Age of Discovery, a 2010 book about the NASA Voyager program by Stephen J. Pyne
 Voyagers, a 1981 novel by Ben Bova
 Voyager Books, an imprint of HarperCollins

Other
 Voyager, a canceled video game by Looking Glass Technologies
 The Voyager Company, a laserdisc and multimedia CD-ROM publisher
 Voyager, a character in Xenosaga
 Voyager, a character appearing in Marvel Comics publications.
 Voyager, a proposed Ferris wheel project to be built in Las Vegas, Nevada

See also
 Now, Voyager, a 1942 American film
 Long Distance Voyager, a 1981 album by the Moody Blues
 Voyager of the Seas, the first of Royal Caribbean International's five Voyager-class cruise ships
 Voyage (disambiguation)
 Voyageur (disambiguation)